Apache Chemistry is a project of the Apache Software Foundation (ASF) which provides  open source Content Management Interoperability Services (CMIS) for Python, Java, PHP and .NET.

Apache Chemistry is becoming a top-level project (TLP) of the ASF.
Before becoming a TLP, Chemistry was just an incubating project, guided in its growth by the Incubator, like all Apache projects when they begin life in the ASF.

Sub-projects

References

External links 
 Apache Chemistry Home Page
 Apache Chemistry - OpenCMIS
 Apache Chemistry - cmislib
 Apache Chemistry - phpclient
 Apache Chemistry - DotCMIS
 Apache Chemistry - ObjectiveCMIS

Chemistry